The Last Futurist Exhibition of Paintings 0,10 (pronounced "zero-ten") was an exhibition presented by the Dobychina Art Bureau at Marsovo Pole, Petrograd, from 19 December 1915 to 17 January 1916. The exhibition was important in inaugurating a form of non-objective art called Suprematism, introducing a daring visual vernacular composed of geometric forms of varying colour, and in signifying the end of Russia's previous leading art movement, Cubo-Futurism, hence the exhibition's full name. The sort of geometric abstraction relating to Suprematism was distinct in the apparent kinetic motion and angular shapes of its elements.

Origin of the name
The mysterious number 0,10 refers to a figure of thought: Zero, either because it was expected that after the destruction of the old world, the year zero could begin again, or because the artists exhibiting wanted to find the core of painting, and ten, because ten artists were originally scheduled to participate. In fact, there were fourteen artists who participated in the exhibition.

The non-numerical part of the exhibition's name - "Last Exhibition of Futurist Paintings" - was coined by the display's main organiser, Ivan Puni.

Background
The first all-Futurist exhibition in Russia, "Tramway V", which was organised by Puni, opened in March that year. Vladimir Tatlin was the main focus of the exhibition, and the display was met with hostility that ultimately led to a succés de scandale. The public response to this previous exhibition would eventually lead Puni to bring together one last exhibition, the 0,10 Exhibition.

Throughout that year, Kazimir Malevich was busily writing and painting about his new art movement inspired by Cubo-Futurism, Suprematism.

Event
The exhibition itself opened on 19 December 1915, and closed on 17 January 1916. Malevich now felt ready to officially announce Suprematism, and thus thirty-nine pieces of his work were on display. Because Malevich and Tatlin were, due to an argument, rivals by the time the exhibition began, some of the artists decided to take sides. Thanks to Malevich's room planning which even Puni was unaware of, the artists who supported Malevich became the victors.

In total, 155 works were shown. Highlights of the exhibition were Malevich's Black Square, Tatlin's Corner Counter Reliefs, and Olga Rozanova's Metronome. Black Square was seen by some visitors as being especially scandalous, because it was placed in the top corner of the room, a location where Russian Orthodox households place their icons. Corner Counter Reliefs were a series of abstract sculptures. Metronome was one of Rozanova's works during the middle stages in her career; the clock can be interpreted as combining moments with the infinite.

Several related publications, for example the catalogue and Malevich's From Cubism to Suprematism, accompanied the exhibition. The poster was designed by Puni.

Impact and legacy
Though only a single photograph of Malevich's exhibition space survives, the exhibition is credited as introducing a groundbreaking new era in avant-garde art. Malevich and several other artists would go on to paint in the Suprematist style, while Tatlin would become a Constructivist, and later become famous for his eponymous Tower.

Artists
The following artists eventually exhibited:

See also 

Suprematism
Russian avant-garde
Vkhutemas

Notes

References and sources
References

Sources
Malevich: Journey to Infinity, 2008. Author: Gerry Souter, 255 pages in English language, publisher: Parkstone International, 
Farewell to an Idea: Episodes from a History of Modernism, 2001. Author: T.J. Clark, 451 pages, Publisher: Yale University Press,

External links 
Museum of Modern Art, Art Terms; Suprematism.

Art exhibitions in Russia
Suprematism (art movement)